Promesa is the second Spanish-language album released by Christian rock band Guardian. The album was released on August 6, 1998 and included Spanish covers of several of the songs from Buzz and Bottle Rocket.

The album followed the massive success the band had in Latin America with their first Spanish release, Nunca te diré adiós.

Track listing
 "Tu Amor" (Miracle Mile "I Found Love")
 "No Compitas Por Su Amor" (Buzz "Them Nails")
 "Sé Me Guía" (Buzz "Lead The Way")
 "Levántame" (Buzz "Lift Me Up")
 "Cómo Podría Hacerte Ver?" (Bottle Rocket "What does it take?")
 "Dulce Misterio" (Miracle Mile "Sweet Mystery)
 "Promesa" (Bottle Rocket "Revelation")
 "Una Tonta Realidad" (Buzz "Psychedelyc Runaway")
 "Esther" (Bottle Rocket "My Queen Esther")
 "Ya No Llores Mas" (Buzz "Lullaby")

Personnel
 Jamie Rowe - vocals
 David Bach - bass guitar, vocals
 Karl Ney - drums
 Tony Palacios - guitar, vocals

External links
Album information at Jesusfreakhideout

Guardian (band) albums
1998 albums